Paul Burlin (September 10, 1886 – March 13, 1969) was an American modern and abstract expressionist painter.

Childhood
Paul Burlin was born Isadore Berlin to Jacob and Julia Berlin in 1886 in New York. The family name was originally Berlinsky. His father was from London. His mother from a small city in Northern Germany near the Polish border. Paul grew up in New York City and London, the oldest of three children. His sister, Carrie, was born in 1890, his brother, David, in 1895. Paul disliked the name Isadore, and stopped using it as soon as he could, when he left home at 16. He found it too painful to discuss his early years, and he refused to do so. Once on his own, he changed his name to Harry Paul Burlin. By 1911, Harry had become H. and by 1915 it was gone altogether. Paul had completely separated from his family and his past, and continued to be forward thinking his whole life.

Artistic education
From 1900 to 1912, Burlin was a part-time student at the National Academy of Art and the Art Student's League.

Travels
Burlin was able to travel in Europe in 1908 to 1909. He visited the southwest United States in 1910. The southwestern paintings he made on the trip to Santa Fe were shown in New York in 1911. The critical acclaim of this exhibition led to his invitation to participate in the Armory Show.

Armory Show
Burlin was invited to participate in the 1913 69th Regiment Armory Show in New York, the first Modern art exhibition in the United States. This was the exhibit that brought the work of the European vanguard, such as Picasso, Manet, Monet, and Degas to the United States.

Santa Fe
Burlin moved to Santa Fe in 1913 and painted there until 1920, while exhibiting his work in New York City. He painted portraits of Pueblo Indians, landscapes, and scenes of local daily life. These themes sold well in New York. Burlin was heavily influenced by the spirituality of the Pueblo Indians. Realist works gave way to experimentation with symbols and anthropomorphism. His work was shown at the Pennsylvania Academy of Fine Arts exhibition in 1919.

First marriage
Paul Burlin met Natalie Curtis (1875–1921), in 1914. Burlin married Natalie Curtis, in 1917. She was an ethnomusicologist working to preserve Native American Indian music in New Mexico. Natalie Curtis is best known for her 1907, "The Indians' Book".

European artistic exile
Paul and Natalie moved to Paris in 1921. Shortly after a successful presentation at a conference on ethnomusicology, Natalie was struck by a taxi on the street and killed. Paul was devastated. He remained in France. In 1924, he married his second wife, Margarete (Margot) Koop.  Margarete was the mother of his only child, Barbara, who was born in 1927. Paul exhibited in New York, and in Paris. He studied European abstract painting styles, which influenced his increasingly socially concerned themes. Living in Europe for a decade may have contributed to Burlin's reception back home. It certainly gave him an opportunity to develop his style. His work was included in the New York Museum of Modern Art's Ninth Exhibition of Painting and Sculpture by Living Americans in 1930. Three of his paintings were shown:  Flowers, 1927, Horses in Stable, ca. 1928, and Hills and Houses. Burlin was not able to attend, however, since he was still in Paris.

Return to the United States
In 1932, Paul, his wife, and daughter moved back to the United States. They settled in New York, where Paul lived for the rest of his life, when he was not traveling or working as an artist in residence. He worked as a member of the Federal Project of the Whitney Museum. Paul Burlin was also among those who signed the call for the American Artist's Congress in 1936. In 1936, Paul and Margarete divorced. Paul married in 1937, to Helen Simonson.

Second World War
Burlin used images from Greek mythology to paint commentary against the brutality of war. He was especially concerned with Jewish persecution. Burlin's own abstract expressionist form crystallized. His key symbols begin to emerge.  Paul Burlin exhibited in the 1944 Art in Progress show.

Abstract expressionism
Paul Burlin begins to use abstract expressionism as a mode for personal expression. Burlin divorced his third wife in 1946 and married Margaret (Peggy) Timmerman in 1947. He and Margaret remained together for the rest of his life. Burlin was invited to be Artist in Residence at many universities and museums such as the University of Minnesota, Washington University in St. Louis, University of Colorado, University of Wyoming, USC, Union College of New York, and the University of Texas.

Last days
In the 1950s, Burlin began to lose his sight. In the next ten years he underwent eight cornea implants. His despair at losing his sight was often a theme in his work. He painted, even at the times when he was declared legally blind. In a respite from the darkness, he painted The Series of Nine very near the end of his life. Paul Burlin died in 1969.  The nine final paintings, which summarize and celebrate the life of the painter were shown at the NY MOMA in 1971, and at the Pasadena Museum in 1972.

Honors and awards
 1913 Art exhibited in the Armory Show
 1930 Included in the New York Museum of Modern Art's Ninth Exhibition of Painting and Sculpture by Living Americans
 1945 The artist's jury for the Pepsi-cola "Portrait of America" contest awarded Burlin first prize for his work titled the "Soda Jerker". The prize was to be $2500. But, Pepsi-cola chose another winner, and Burlin was not allowed to collect.
 1959 One of three first prize winners of $1000 for Art USA: 59, New York, for "Rose, White, Uptight."
 1962 First prize from the Pennsylvania Academy for "Red, Red, Not the Same II"
 1962 Listed as one of 102 Artists "To Wax Enthusiastic About" in Time Magazine, July 6, 1962.
 1963 Burlin mentioned in the 50th anniversary of the 1913 Armory Show.

Retrospectives
 1962: The American Federation of Arts: Exhibitions in Philadelphia, Boston and New York, sponsored by the Ford Foundation Program in Humanities and the Arts
 1970-1971: The Museum of Modern Art, New York and the Pasadena Art Museum, Pasadena, California, Exhibition of The Last Nine

Public Collections
 Metropolitan Museum of Art
 Museum of Modern Art
 Whitney Museum of American Art
 New Mexico Museum of Art

References

Notes

Sources
 "Unprized Prizewinner". Time Magazine. Dec. 31, 1945.
 Myers, Bernard: The Painting of Paul Burlin, "Perspectives". Washington University in St. Louis, Spring 1954.
 HIS: Armory Show Veteran at Alan Gallery. "Art News", 57:11, February 1958.
 "102 Artists to Wax Enthusiastic About". Time Magazine. July 6, 1962.
 Whitney, George. Abrupt Ending: The Work of Paul Burlin. Arts. Sept. 1981, p. 97.
 Filreis, Alan. "Beyond The Rhetorician's Touch": Stevens's Painterly Astractions, American Literary History, Spring 1992, pp. 230–63.
 Wedell, Eugene. "Paul Burlin Catalog", Burlin Art Trust, 2008.

External links

 Library listing for Paul Burlin papers including letters, sketchbooks and interviews
 List of 102 Artists, including Burlin, “To Wax Enthusiastic About”
 Provincetown, MA Art Association and Museum permanent collection
 New York Times article, Art: Paul Burlin, A Case Of December Flowering, September 11, 1981
 Art Student’s League list of past instructors, Paul Burlin
 Duchamp’s 1963 speech about the painters included in the 1913 show
 Works at New Mexico Museum of Art

1886 births
1969 deaths
20th-century American painters
American male painters
Abstract expressionist artists
Art Students League of New York alumni
Painters from New York City
Artists from Santa Fe, New Mexico
Painters from New Mexico
20th-century American male artists
University of Minnesota faculty
Washington University in St. Louis faculty
University of Colorado faculty
University of Wyoming faculty
University of Southern California faculty
Union College (New York) faculty
University of Texas at Austin faculty